John III Doukas Vatatzes (died 1254) was  Emperor of Nicaea in 1221–1254.

John Vatatzes or Batatzes may also refer to:
 John Komnenos Vatatzes (died 1183), Byzantine general
 John Vatatzes (megas stratopedarches) (died 1345), Byzantine general and official